Jävre River (Swedish: Jävreån) is a river in Sweden.

References

Rivers of Norrbotten County